The Pakistan Rugby Union (PRU) is the rugby union governing body in Pakistan. It is in charge of the Pakistan national  team. Also among the Union's chief activities are conferences, organising international matches, and educating and training players and officials. 

It was formally established in 2000 and gained membership of the Asian Rugby Football Union in 2000. In 2003, it became a member of International Rugby Board. Currently, it is a full member of World Rugby, Asia Rugby, Pakistan Olympic Association, and is recognized by the Pakistan Sports Board as the governing body of the sport in the country .

Fawzi Khawaja, Arif Saeed, and Salman Muzaffar Shaikh are, respectively, the current chairman, president, and secretary-general of the Union, having been elected on 24 March 2021.

History 
The origins of rugby union in Pakistan can be traced back to the Karachi Football Rugby Union (KFRU), which was founded in 1925. It was active on the All-India circuit up till the late 1950s. A few local players joined the club in 1968–1969. However, the sport saw a decline by the mid-1970s, as the Royal Navy reduced its presence in the Indian Ocean which caused a decline in its visits to the Pakistani ports. By the early-1980s, the sport had almost died out. KFRU continued playing, but found itself unable to travel abroad for matches dues to lack of funding. There was also a dearth of local teams who were available to play against.

Things took a turn in the 1990s, when local players, who were introduced to the sport in the 1970s, founded clubs in Lahore and Karachi. Moreover, staff from foreign embassies, high commissions, and banks established the Islamabad Rugby Football Club in 1992. Regular matches between these clubs followed soon afterwards.

This led to the formation of the Pakistan Rugby Union in 2000 to further promote the game on a national level. In 2003, Pakistan fielded a national team for the first time, participating in the Provincial Tournament in Sri Lanka. It played the Indian national side there as well. Pakistan Rugby Union then became an associate member of the International Rugby Board (later renamed to World Rugby) in November 2003. It received its full membership in 2008.

Activities 
Rugby has now been introduced at the provincial and district level by the Pakistan Rugby Union. Schools have also been targeted for rugby to be introduced at the grassroots level. PRU is also an active part of the World Rugby’s “Get into Rugby” programme, which aims to increase the participation in the sport. PRU has competed in a number of events organised by Asia Rugby, and has arranged several domestic competitions at both senior and age grade level for men and women. Regularly training and development courses are also arranged to meet the growing demand for training professionals.

Rugby is also one of the events in the National Games of Pakistan - a move that has reportedly resulted in the employment of over 200 players by universities and departments.

Affiliations 

 World Rugby
 Asia Rugby
 Pakistan Olympic Association
 Pakistan Sports Board

Affiliated associations

The four provinces 
 Balochistan Rugby Association
 Khyber Pakhtunkhwa Rugby Association
 Punjab Rugby Association
 Sindh Rugby Association

The two territories 
 FATA Rugby Association
 Islamabad Rugby Association

National departments 
 Higher Education Commission (HEC)
 Pakistan Army
 Pakistan Navy
 Pakistan Police
 Pakistan Railways
 Water and Power Development Authority (WAPDA)

See also
 Rugby union in Pakistan
 Pakistan national rugby union team
 Sports in Pakistan

External links
 Official website
 Pakistan on World Rugby
 Pakistan on rugbydata.com

References 

Rugby union in Pakistan
Rugby union governing bodies in Asia
Rug

Sports organizations established in 2000
2000 establishments in Pakistan